Hummel International Sport & Leisure A/S, commonly known as Hummel (stylized hummel), is a Danish manufacturing company of sportswear brand based in Aarhus owned by Thornico. The company currently manufactures apparel for football, rugby league, futsal, handball, basketball, shinty, volleyball and esport teams. Moreover, the company also offers apparel and footwear for children alongside its fashion sub-brand, Hummel HIVE.

The company was founded in 1923 by Albert Messmer and his brother Michael Ludwig Messmer, with the name "Messmer & Co" in Hamburg, Germany; that same year, the Messmer brothers introduced the first football boots to the world. Hummel became Danish after being taken over by Bernhard Weckenbrock in 1956, who moved its base to Kevelaer, North Rhine-Westphalia. Since 1999, Hummel has been a part of the Danish Thornico Group founded by Christian and Thor Stadil.

Being one of the oldest sportswear brands in the business with roots in football & handball, Hummel has previously been worn by football teams such as Real Madrid, Tottenham Hotspur, Aston Villa, Southampton, Benfica and the Denmark national team. Today, Hummel continues to sponsor clubs and players within handball and football.

Historical logo 
The Hummel logo is a stylized bumblebee, as Hummel is German for "bumble bee".

Sponsorships 
The following teams and association are currently sponsored by Hummel:

Association football

National teams

Non-national representative teams

Club teams                  

 Algeria   
  JS Kabylie  
 Andorra
  Atlètic Club d'Escaldes 
 Argentina
  Chacarita Juniors 
  Platense
  Quilmes AC 
  Temperley 
 Australia
  Sydney University
  Capital Football
 Austria
  Flyeralarm Admira 
  FC Pinzgau Saalfelden
  SV Ried
 Bulgaria
  Minyor Pernik
  Spartak Pleven
 Bhutan
  Thimphu City FC
 Congo
  AS Otôho
 Cyprus
  Akritas Chlorakas
 Denmark
  Akademisk BK
  Aarhus GF
  AC Horsens
  BK Marienlyst
  Brabrand IF 
  Brøndby IF
  Esbjerg fB  
  Christiania S.C.
  FC Fredericia
  FC Horsens
  Greve
  Jammerbugt FC
  Kolding IF
  Odense BK
  Ringkøbing IF
  Slagelse B&I
  SønderjyskE
  Vejle Boldklub
 England
  Cambridge United 
  Coventry City
  Everton
  Fleetwood Town
  Hashtag United
  Hyde United 
  Northampton Town
  Nuneaton Griff
  Oldham Athletic
  Southampton 
  St Albans 
  AFC Wimbledon (Only Lasted For One Season) 《Deal Ended Early》
  Yeovil Town 
 France: 
 Gazélec Ajaccio
 Saint-Étienne 
 US Concarneau
 Germany
  1. FC Köln 
  1. FC Magdeburg   (From 2023-2024 season)
  Hertha 03
  VfB Lübeck
  ZFC Meuselwitz
  VfB Oldenburg
  Teutonia Ottensen
  Wacker Burghausen
  Weiche Flensburg
  Werder Bremen  (From 2023-2024 season)
  Werder Bremen II  (From 2023-2024 season)
 Guatemala
  Comunicaciones
 Hungary
  Szeged-Csanád
  Szolnoki MÁV
 Iceland
  ÍBV Vestmannaeyjar
  Fjölnir
India 
  Hyderabad FC
  Kenkre FC
  FC Bengaluru United
 Japan
  Fukushima United FC
  Gamba Osaka  
  JEF United Chiba
  Zweigen Kanazawa
 South Korea
  Gyeongnam FC
  Suwon FC
 Lithuania
  Kauno Žalgiris
  Panevėžys
  Šilutė
 Libya
  Al-Ahly   (From 2023-2024 season)
 Netherlands
  De Graafschap
  FC Emmen
 North Macedonia
  FK Vardar
 Northern Ireland
  Crusaders
 Norway
  KFUM-Kameratene Oslo
  Lyn Fotball
  Odds Ballklubb
  Sandnes Ulf
  Sarpsborg 08
 Oman
  Al-Khaburah
 Poland
  Garbarnia Kraków 
  GKS Katowice 
  GKS Tychy 
  Górnik Zabrze
  Motor Lublin 
  Polonia Warsaw
  Zagłębie Sosnowiec 
 Portugal
  Nacional
  Braga
  Vianense
 Scotland
  Ayr United
  Grahamston
  Kilmarnock
  Montrose 
 Serbia
  FK BSK Borča
 Spain
  Costa Brava
  Illescas 
  Las Palmas
  L'Hospitalet
  Málaga
  Pobla de Mafumet
  Sabadell
  Real Betis 
  Real Betis B
  Tenerife
  UCAM Murcia
  Gimnástica Segoviana
  Utrera
 Ukraine
  Lyubomyr Stavyshche
  MFA Mukachevo
 Tunisia
 CS Sfaxien
 Uganda
  URA
 United States
  Brooklyn City FC
  Charleston Battery
  Chattanooga FC
  Florida Tropics 
  Forward Madison 
  Green Bay Voyageurs 
  Greenville Triumph SC
  Hartford Athletic
  Hartford City
  Iowa Raptors FC
  Lane United
  Milwaukee Torrent
  PDX FC
  Philadelphia Fury
  Providence City
  Sacramento Republic FC
  SoCal SC
  Stumptown Athletic
  Union Omaha

Basketball

Club teams
 Spain
  Lenovo Tenerife

Paddlesport

National Federations
 Great Britain
  British Canoeing (Olympic & Paralympic Canoe, Kayak & Extreme Kayak GB Teams)

Handball

National teams

Club teams

 Belgium
   Initia Hasselt
 Croatia
  RK Zagreb
  RK Zamet
 Czech Republic
   HC Zlín
   DHK Zora Olomouc
   HK Lovosovice
   SHC Maloměřice Brno
   DHC Sokol Poruba
   HC Britterm Veselí Nad Moravou
   Talent Plzeň
   TJ Lokomotiva Louny
   Tatran Litovel
   TJ Náchod
 Denmark
  Aalborg Håndbold
  Århus Håndbold
  SK Aarhus (women's)
  Team Esbjerg (women's)
  SønderjyskE Håndbold
  Mors-Thy Håndbold
  Ringkøbing Håndbold (women's)
  Team Tvis Holstebro
 France
  Billère Handball Pau Pyrénées
  C' Chartres Métropole
  JS Cherbourg
  Pontault-Combault
  Tremblay en France
  US Créteil
 Germany
  ASV Hamm-Westfalen
  Bayer 04 Leverkusen (handball)
  EHV Aue
  Eulen Ludwigshafen
  Frisch Auf Göppingen
  GWD Minden
  Handball Hamburg
  HSG Nordhorn-Lingen
  SC Magdeburg 
  SG BBM Bietigheim 
  SG Flensburg-Handewitt (From 2023/24)
  THW Kiel 
  TUSEM Essen 
  TuS Fürstenfeldbruck 
  VfL Gummersbach 
  VfL Lübeck-Schwartau 
  Wilhelmshaven HV 
 Hungary
  Balassagyarmati Kábel
  Békés-Drén KC
  Budaörs (women's)
  Csurgó
  Dunaújvárosi Kohász (women's)
  Fehérvár KC (women's)
  Kecskemét (women's)
  CYEB Mizse KC
  Pénzügyőr (women's)
  Siófok (women's)
  K. Szeged SE (women's)
  ARAGOTörökszentmiklósi KE
  Vecsés SE-Él Team
 Iceland
  ÍBV Vestmannaeyjar
 Lithuania
   Granitas-karys
 Montenegro
  ZRK Buducnost (women's)
 Netherlands
   Beekse Fusie Club
   E&O
   HV Volendam
   Kras Volendam
 North Macedonia
  RK Vardar Skopje
 Norway
    Nøtterøy Håndball
    ØIF Arendal
    Flint Tønsberg Håndball AL
    Stord HK
    Oppsal Håndball
    Nordstrand Håndball
 Poland
  AZS Politechnika Koszalin
  EB Start Elbląg
  SPR Chrobry Głogów
 Romania
  Măgura Cisnădie (women's)
  HC Zalău (women's) 
  CSM Roman (women's)
  CSM Slatina (women's)
  Dunărea Călărași
  CSU Suceava
  CSM Focșani 
 Slovakia
   HC SPORTA Hlohovec
  SKP Bratislava
 Slovenia
  RK Cimos Koper
  RK Gorenje Velenje
   1.NLB leasing handball league
  RK Trimo Trebnje
   RK Krško
 Spain
  Balonmano Sinfín
  BM Puente Genil
  BM Granollers
  Quabit Guadalajara
  BM Remudas
 Sweden
  IF GUIF
  IFK Kristianstad
 Switzerland
   HC KTV Altdorf
   BSV Bern
  LK Zug
   Basel Regio
   LC Brühl
 Turkey
  Beşiktaş J.K. Handball Team

Rugby Union

Club teams
  Wasps
  Agen Rugby

Rugby League

National teams
  Great Britain Rugby League Lions
  Brazil (female)

Club teams
  Wigan Warriors
  Wakefield Trinity
  Hull FC

Volleyball

National teams

Club teams
  Arago de Sète
  Allianz MTV Stuttgart
  Draisma Dynamo Apeldoorn
  Calcit Volley Kamnik
  Las Palmas

Other
  Super League Referees

Esports

Teams
 Astralis
 beGenius
 Brøndby IF eSport
 FUTWIZ
 Future FC
 Hashtag United
 PENTA
 RedBull Racing Esports
 Tricked Esport
 Team Vitality

Players
 Genki Morita

Cycling

Teams 
  AG2R Citroën Team

References

External links 

 

Clothing companies of Denmark
Sporting goods manufacturers of Denmark
Danish brands
Sportswear brands
Sporting goods brands
Danish companies established in 1924